Brian Turnbull (born 1999) is an Irish hurler who plays for Cork Senior Championship club Douglas and at inter-county level with the Cork senior hurling team. He usually lines out as a left corner-forward.

Playing career

St. Francis College

Turnbull first came to prominence as a hurler with St. Francis College in Rochestown. He played in every grade of hurling before eventually joining the college's senior hurling team. On 21 December 2015, Turnbull scored 3-04 for St. Francis College when they defeated Scoil Mhuire gan Smál from Blarney to win the Dr. O'Callaghan Cup.

Douglas

Turnbull joined the Douglas club at a young age and played in all grades at juvenile and underage levels. On 21 September 2015, he scored three points from right corner-forward when Douglas defeated Sarsfields by 3-12 to 0-13 to win the Premier 1 MHC title. 

Turnbull subsequently joined the Douglas under-21 team. On 13 November 2016, he won a Cork Premier Under-21 Championship title after a defeat of reigning-champions Blackrock.

Turnbull made his first senior championship appearance on 7 May 2017 when he came on as a substitute in a 0-22 to 0-20 defeat by Cork Institute of Technology.

On 10 September 2017, Turnbull ruptured his anterior cruciate ligament (ACL) during a training session with the Douglas under-21 football team. He later said: "I was coming onto a ball and while I was turning, another player came into the back of me. The knee was driven inwards, I heard the pop. I went down and I wasn’t able to walk then. I went about getting the scan done as quick as possible. If anybody told me it was going to be the cruciate, I refused to listen. I probably should have because it made the hearing very hard to take. I was very upset for the next couple of weeks after it but I have to start moving on." Turnbull underwent surgery at the Santry Sports Clinic on 31 October.

Cork

Minor, under-21 and under-20

Turnbull first lined out for Cork as a member of the minor team during the 2016 Munster Championship. He was an unused substitute when Cork exited the championship after a 0-23 to 1-12 defeat by Tipperary at the semi-final stage.

Turnbull was eligible for the minor grade again the following year and made his first appearance on 3 May 2017. He scored ten points, including three frees, in Cork's 1-24 to 0-08 defeat if Waterford. On 9 July, Turnbull scored four points when Cork defeated Clare by 4-21 to 0-16 to win the Munster Championship for the first time since 2008. On 3 September, he was at left corner-forward when Cork faced Galway in the All-Ireland final. Turnbull finished the game as top scorer with 1-07, however, Cork were defeated by 2-17 to 2-15. He finished the championship as top scorer while he was later included at left corner-forward on the inaugural GAA Minor Star Awards Hurling Team of the Year as well as being named GAA Minor Star Hurler of the Year.

On 26 August 2018, Turnbull was named on the Cork under-21 team as a substitute for the All-Ireland final against Tipperary. He was introduced as a 38th-minute substitute for Liam Healy in the 3-13 to 1-16 defeat.

On 3 July 2019, Turnbull made his first appearance for Cork's inaugural under-20 team. He scored four points from right corner-forward in the 1-20 to 0-16 defeat of Limerick. On 23 July 2019, Turnbull scored two points from play when Cork suffered a 3-15 to 2-17 defeat by Tipperary in the Munster final. He was selected at right corner-forward when Cork faced Tipperary for a second time in the All-Ireland final on 24 August 2019. Turnbull top scored for Cork with 0-08, including seven frees, but ended the game on the losing side after a 5-17 to 1-18 defeat.

Senior

Turnbull was added to the Cork senior hurling team for their National Hurling League game against Limerick on 24 February 2019. He remained on the bench throughout and was not included on any of Cork's subsequent league or championship match-day panels.

On 20 December 2019, Turnbull made his first appearance for the Cork senior team when he was selected at left corner-forward for Cork's Munster League game against Kerry. He scored two points from play in the 1-27 to 0-11 victory. Turnbull subsequently made his National League debut on 16 February 2020 when he was introduced as a 60th-minute substitute for Jack O'Connor in a 3-12 to 1-14 defeat of Westmeath. He was later included on Cork's Munster Championship panel and made his debut as a 72nd-minute substitute for Séamus Harnedy in a 1-28 to 1-24 defeat by Waterford.

Career statistics

Club

Inter-county

Honours

Team

St. Francis College
Dr. O'Callaghan Cup (1): 2015

Douglas
Cork Premier Under-21 A Hurling Championship (1): 2016
Cork Premier 1 Minor Hurling Championship (1): 2015

Cork
Munster Minor Hurling Championship (1): 2017

Individual

Awards
GAA Minor Star Hurler of the Year (1): 2017
GAA Minor Star Hurling Team of the Year Award (1): 2017

References

External links
2018 Cork Under-21 Hurling team player profiles at the Cork GAA website

1999 births
Living people
Douglas hurlers
Cork inter-county hurlers